Spitakavor Monastery, is a 14th-century Armenian monastic complex,  north of Vernashen village, near the town of Yeghegnadzor of Vayots Dzor Province, Armenia.

Geography
The Spitakavor Monastery is located on the slopes of Teksar mountain of the Vayots Dzor Province. The terrain is difficult, but the monastery can be reached on foot or with an all-terrain vehicle.

Monastery and church

Behind fortified walls lies buildings of white shaved (felsite, including the monastery, church, a bell-tower and vestibule.

Its main monument is the Spitakavor Church of the Holy Mother of God (Spitakavor Church of Surp Astvatsatsin). Due to the number of springtime flowers that surround the monastery, it is sometimes called Tsaghkavank (the Monastery of Flowers) by the villagers of Vernashen. An image, described as "a remarkable example of mid-century Armenian sculpture" of Mary (mother of Jesus), is chiseled into the headstone of the church's entrance. Other interesting artistic works included a sculpture of Jesus with his disciples and a relief of Eachi and his son. The History Museum of Armenia in Yerevan now holds a wall hanging that depicts Prince Hasan. The relief of the prince and his father is at the Hermitage Museum in Saint Petersburg, Russia.

Although the monastery is small and somewhat remote, it has been described as follows:

History
The 14th-century Spitakavor Monastery was built by two princes from the Proshian dynasty during the Zakarid Armenia period. The construction of the church began by Prince Eachi (died in 1318) and completed in 1321 by his son Prince Amir Hasan II. Between 1321 and 1330, the narthex was built, and in 1330 Hovhannes Proshian and his wife, Tadzna, added a three-story bell-tower to the western wall of narthex.

The monastery became an "important cultural, educational and spiritual center" under the guidance of Father Superior and Phililogist Vardapet Avagter.

There were two other monasteries in the area, Tanade and St. Khach monasteries, and the three used fire signals to communicate in "ancient times". The monastery was attacked in the 14th century by Lenk Timur whose armies destroyed its walls and narthex, known in Armenia as gavit. In the 14th or 15th century, after the fall of the Mongols, Ak-Koyunlu and Kara Koyunlu tribes attacked and "devastated" the region, including the monastery church gavit, monastery defense walls, and service building. Without restoration of the destroyed buildings and walls, the church of the monastery stood until the Persian-Ottoman War when in 1604 thousands of Armenians were forcibly resettled under Shah Abbas.

The church and the remains of the monastery remain. Information panels in Armenian, Russian, Italian, French and English were installed for visitors.

Garegin Nzhdeh
The remains of the Armenian military leader and political thinker Garegin Nzhdeh were secretly buried in the yard of Spitakavor Monastery on 9 May 1987 or in 1983. He had died in a Soviet prison in 1955. Annually on June 17 Armenians across the world conduct a pilgrimage to the monastery's graveyard.

Gallery

See also
 Proshaberd

Notes

References

Christian monasteries in Armenia
Tourist attractions in Vayots Dzor Province
1321 establishments in Europe
Christian monasteries established in the 14th century
Buildings and structures in Vayots Dzor Province